Han Kyu-seol (Hangul:한규설, Hanja:韓圭卨 29 February 1848 – 22 September 1930) was a prime minister of Korean Empire when Japan–Korea Treaty of 1905 was signed. Han opposed the treaty, but he failed to prevent it from being signed.

Life 
Han was born on 29 February 1848 in Seoul. In his young age, Han passed the Gwageo's military examination. In 1884, Han became the commander of army of the in Gyeongsang-right province.

During the Gapsin Coup, his younger brother, Han Kyu-jin was killed. Gojong of Korea was pathetic about him so that Gojong appointed Han one of the Commissioner Generals of the police. With Yu Kil-chun, Han traveled United States. After the proclaim of Korean Empire, Han was appointed in many important jobs. On 15 February 1902, Han was appointed as Minister of Law. On 27 August 1905, Han was appointed as the prime minister, then Lieutenant General of the army on 8 November 1905. As a prime minister, Han opposed the Eulsa Treaty. However, Han failed to prevent the treaty from being signed. After the treaty of 1905 was signed, Han, as well as Five Eulsa Traitors, got a lot of criticism from the people. After the treaty, Han was removed from office on 17 November 1905 for doing an inappropriate thing inside the palace. Choe Ik-hyeon wrote that Han also has a great fault for the treaty, which is not caring his ministers and letting them to agree. Han wrote memorial about this incident. Han wrote that at the first time, all of the ministers were against signing the treaty. However, when Han was locked in Jungmyeongjeon, ministers started to agree. After the signing, he tried to invalidate the treaty by dismissal to the five ministers but, Han was who got dismissal. On 30 November 1905, his dismissal was canceled. After, he still was an official of Korea. He was one of the member of national assembly and special official in Gungnaebu. On 18 December 1906, Han was appointed as the speaker of Junchuwon. In 1907, he was removed from the army because he did not have any placement.

After the annexation of Korea, Japanese Government gave Han title of Baron but Han refused. In 1920, Han established Joseon education organization with some others. He died on 22 September 1930 in Cheongju City.

On 17 March 1977, Han's house became heritage of Seoul.

Honours 

 Order of the Palgwae 1st Class

References 

1848 births
1930 deaths
Lieutenant generals of Korean Empire
Officials of the Korean Empire
Imperial Korean military personnel
19th-century Korean people
20th-century Korean people
Politicians of the Korean Empire